Gilbert R. Thompson  (born 1932) is a British physician and researcher in lipidology.

Thompson studied at St Thomas' Hospital Medical School, graduating in 1956.

After National Service, he was at the Royal Postgraduate Medical School Hospital from 1963 to 1998, but including time at Massachusetts General Hospital, the Methodist Hospital, Houston and the Royal Victoria Hospital, Montreal, as a researcher.

He was Honorary Consultant Physician in charge of the lipid clinic at Hammersmith Hospital from 1993 to 1998.

He served as chair of the British Hyperlipidaemia Association and of the British Atherosclerosis Society.

Since formal retirement in 1998, he has been Emeritus Professor in Clinical Lipidology at Imperial College, London.

He has been an associate editor of the Journal of Lipid Research, and founding editor of Current Opinion in Lipidology.

He was awarded the 1981 Lucien Award, "designed to honour outstanding research in the field of circulatory diseases", in Montreal. He is a Distinguished Fellow of the International Atherosclerosis Society, and a Fellow of the Royal College of Physicians.

References

External links 

 
 

1932 births
Place of birth missing (living people)
Fellows of the Royal College of Physicians
Living people
20th-century British medical doctors
British medical researchers
Academics of Imperial College London

Alumni of St Thomas's Hospital Medical School